The International Federation of Robotics (IFR) is a professional non-profit organization established in 1987 to promote, strengthen and protect the robotics industry worldwide.

Activities
The purpose of the International Federation of Robotics is to promote research, development, use and international co-operation in the field of robotics, both industrial automated robots and service robots. The IFR is also coordinator of the International Symposium on Robotics (ISR), one of the oldest conferences for robotics research, founded in 1970.

Members
Today nearly all international industrial robot suppliers and 17 national robots associations are members of IFR. Headquarters of this umbrella organization of national robotics associations is in Frankfurt, Germany.

Key persons
President: Marina Bill (ABB Robotics)
General Secretary: Dr. Susanne Bieller (VDMA)
Chairman, Research Committee: Alexander Verl (University of Stuttgart)
Chairman, Industrial Robot Supplier Group: Marcus Mead (Yaskawa)
Chairman, Service Robotics Group: Francesco Ferro (PAL Robotics) and Werner Kraus (Fraunhofer IPA)

Notes

External links
 International Federation of Robotics
Automation

Robotics organizations
International professional associations
Organizations established in 1987